is a song recorded by Japanese singer Misia. It is the theme song of the 2017 Warner Bros. Pictures live action film Fullmetal Alchemist. The song was written by Misia, with lyrics that portray the brotherly bond between the two main characters, Edward and Alphonse, and composed by Los Angeles-based Japanese musician Ichi, and Mayu Wakisaka.

Background and composition
The track, which was initially submitted to Misia five years prior, was reworked by Misia and Ichi specifically with the film in mind. On September 26, 2017, it was announced that Misia had recorded the song for the film and that it would be released on November 29, 2017, in the same week as the film. "Kimi no Soba ni Iru yo" is written in the key of E-flat minor with a common time tempo of 128 beats per minute. Misia's vocals span from F3 to C5 in modal voice, and up to E5 in head voice.

Music video
Following the release announcement, an accompanying music video, directed by Fullmetal Alchemist director Fumihiko Sori, was filmed at Toho Studios and premiered through Misia's YouTube channel on November 24, 2017.

Chart performance
"Kimi no Soba ni Iru yo" debuted on the daily Oricon Singles Chart at number 27. It ranked at number 37 on the weekly Oricon Singles Chart, selling 2,000 copies in its first week. The single charted for three weeks and sold a reported total of 3,000  copies.

Track listing

Charts

References

2017 singles
2017 songs
Misia songs
Songs written for films
Fullmetal Alchemist songs
Japanese film songs
Ariola Japan singles
Songs written by Misia